Kentron, is one of the 12 districts of Yerevan, the capital of Armenia. It comprises the downtown, the commercial centre of the city. As of the 2011 census, the district has a population of 125,453.

Kentron is bordered by Ajapnyak and Malatia-Sebastia districts from the west, Shengavit and Erebuni districts from the south, Nor Nork District from the east and Arabkir and Kanaker-Zeytun districts from the north. Hrazdan River flows through the western part of the district.

Etymology 
The word kentron literally means "centre" in Armenian, and has the same etymological root as the English word, ultimately from Ancient Greek κέντρον (kéntron, "centre"). Its Western Armenian cognate is getron.

Overview
The district is unofficially divided into smaller neighborhoods such as Kond, Noragyugh, Pokr Kentron, Nor Kilikia, Kozern and Aygestan.

Kond and Noragyugh are among the 7 original neighbourhoods of old Yerevan.

Parks:
English Park.
Children's Park
Abovyan Children's Park and Railway
Tsitsernakaberd Park
Circular Park
Lovers' Park
Martiros Saryan Park
Komitas Park
Shahumyan Park
Missak Manouchian Park

History

After Armenia fell under Soviet rule between 1920 and 1921, Yerevan became the first among the cities in the Soviet Union for which a general plan was developed. The "General Plan of Yerevan" developed by the academic Alexander Tamanian, was approved in 1924. It was initially designed for a population of 150,000. The city was quickly transformed into a modern industrial metropolis of over one million people. New educational, scientific and cultural institutions were founded as well.

Tamanian incorporated national traditions with contemporary urban construction. His design presented a radial-circular arrangement that overlaid the existing city and incorporated much of its existing street plan. As a result, many historic buildings in the centre (modern-day Kentron district) of Yerevan were demolished, including churches, mosques, the Safavid fortress, baths, bazaars and caravanserais.

Within the years, Kentron has become the most developed district of Yerevan, something that created a significant gap compared with other districts in the city. Most of the educational, cultural and scientific institutions were centred in the Kentron district. It also became home to administrative buildings of Armenia, including the Presidential Palace, the National Assembly of Armenia, the Central Bank of Armenia, the National Security Service and most of the ministry buildings.

Demographics
Religious buildings and historical sites:

Zoravor Surp Astvatsatsin Church
Saint Sarkis Cathedral
Katoghike Church
Saint John the Baptist Church
Saint Gregory Cathedral
Surp Anna Church
Blue Mosque
Kond neighbourhood
Yerevan Red Bridge of the 17th century

Culture

National Library of Armenia
National Gallery of Armenia
Yerevan Opera Theater
Sundukyan State Academic Theatre
Paronyan Musical Comedy Theatre
Stanislavski Russian Theatre
Hovhannes Tumanyan Puppet Theatre of Yerevan
Komitas Chamber Music Hall
Arno Babajanian Concert Hall
Museum-Institute of Ancient Manuscripts
History Museum of Armenia
Cafesjian Museum of Art
Yerevan History Museum
The Armenian Genocide Museum-Institute
Sergei Parajanov Museum
House-Museum of Aram Khachaturian
Khnko Aper Children's Library
Avetik Isahakyan Central Library
Center of Contemporary Experimental Art

Entertainment and recreation:

Moscow Cinema
Nairi Cinema
Yerevan Circus
Yerevan Cascade
Tashir Mall
Yerevan Vernissage of art exhibition

Transportation

Kentron district is served by a public transport network of buses and trolleybuses.
The Yerevan underground metro has 4 stations in the Kentron district: 
Marshal Baghramyan station
Yeritasardakan station
Republic Square station
General Andranik station

Aram Street
Abovyan Street
Mashtots Avenue
Mikael Nalbandian Street
Amiryan Street
Tigran Mets (Tigranes the Great) Avenue
Sayat-Nova Avenue
Tumanyan Street
Marshal Baghramyan Avenue
Charents Street
Paronyan Street
Proshyan Street
Italy Street
Vazgen Sargsyan Street
Argishti I Street
Northern Avenue
Saralanj Avenue
Republic Square
Freedom Square
Charles Aznavour Square
Andrei Sakharov Square
Square of Russia
Place de France
Stepan Shahumyan Square
Alexandr Myasnikyan Square

Economy
Industrial plants:

Yerevan Ararat Wine Factory
Yerevan Brandy Company
Electro-House engineering factory

Education
Educational institutions:

Yerevan State University
Yerevan State University of Architecture and Construction
Yerevan State Musical Conservatory
Armenian State Pedagogical University
Yerevan State Medical University
State Engineering University of Armenia
Yerevan State Linguistic University
Armenian State University of Economics
Armenian National Academy of Sciences

Sport

Armenia Sports Stadium
Republican Stadium
Tigran Petrosian Chess House
Hrazdan Stadium
Karen Demirchyan Complex
Orange Tennis Club
Master Class Tennis Club
Dinamo Sports Arena
Kilikia Sports Hall
Pyunik Stadium
Pyunik Training Centre

Gallery

References

Populated places in Armenia
Districts of Yerevan